The FIBT World Championships 1951 took place in Alpe d'Huez, France. Germany returned to the FIBT World Championships for the first time since World War II, albeit as the separate countries of East Germany and West Germany.

Two man bobsleigh

Four man bobsleigh

Medal table

References
2-Man bobsleigh World Champions
4-Man bobsleigh World Champions

IBSF World Championships
1951 in bobsleigh
International sports competitions hosted by France
Bobsleigh in France 
1951 in French sport